Hiero II (c. 308 BC – 215 BC) was the Greek tyrant of Syracuse from 275 to 215 BC, and the illegitimate son of a Syracusan noble, Hierocles, who claimed descent from Gelon. He was a former general of Pyrrhus of Epirus and an important figure of the First Punic War.
He figures in the story of famed thinker Archimedes shouting "Eureka".

Rise to power

On the departure of Pyrrhus from Sicily (275 BC) the Syracusan army and citizens appointed him commander of the troops. He strengthened his position by marrying the daughter of Leptines, the leading citizen. In the meantime, the Mamertines, a body of Campanian mercenaries who had been employed by Agathocles, had seized the stronghold of Messina, and proceeded in harassing the Syracusans. They were finally defeated in a pitched battle near Mylae along the Longanus river by Hiero, who was only prevented from capturing Messina by Carthaginian interference. His grateful countrymen then made him king (275).

First Punic War
In 264 BC he again returned to the attack, and the Mamertines called in the aid of Rome. Hiero at once joined the Punic leader Hanno, who had recently landed in Sicily; but fighting a battle to an inconclusive outcome with the Romans led by the consul Appius Claudius Caudex, he withdrew to Syracuse.

Pressed by the Roman forces, in 263 he concluded a treaty with Rome, by which he was to rule over the south-east of Sicily and the eastern coast as far as Tauromenium.

After the Punic War
From this time until his death in 215 BC he remained loyal to the Romans, and frequently assisted them with men and provisions during the Punic war. He kept up a powerful fleet for defensive purposes, and employed his famous kinsman Archimedes in the construction of those engines that, at a later date, played so important a part during the siege of Syracuse by the Romans.

According to a story told by Vitruvius, Hiero suspected he was being cheated by the goldsmith to whom he had supplied the gold to make a votive crown for a temple. He asked Archimedes to find out if all the gold had been used, as had been agreed. Archimedes, on discovering the principle of displacement needed to measure the density of the crown is said to have shouted "eureka, eureka!" while running naked through Syracuse. Vitruvius concludes this story by stating that Archimedes' method successfully detected the goldsmith's fraud; he had taken some of the gold and substituted silver instead.

Legacy and honors
A picture of the prosperity of Syracuse during his rule is given in the sixteenth idyll of Theocritus, his favourite poet.

In the 16th century treatise The Prince (Chapter 6), Machiavelli cites Hiero as an exceptionally virtuous man and a rare example of someone who rose to princely power from previously being a private individual, comparing him to Moses, Cyrus, Theseus, and Romulus.

References

Further reading

|width=25% align=center|Preceded by:Controlled by Pyrrhus of Epirus  
|width=25% align=center|Tyrant of Syracuse275 BC – 215 BC
|width=25% align=center|Succeeded by:Hieronymus
|-

300s BC births
215 BC deaths
Sicilian tyrants
Pyrrhic War
Sicilian Greeks
3rd-century BC rulers
3rd-century BC Syracusans